Mount Malville is a mountain,  high, standing  southwest of Ackerman Nunatak in the northern part of the Forrestal Range, Pensacola Mountains, Antarctica. It was mapped by the United States Geological Survey from surveys and U.S. Navy air photos from 1956 to 1966, and was named by the Advisory Committee on Antarctic Names for J. McKim Malville, an auroral scientist at Ellsworth Station during the winter of 1957.

References

Mountains of Queen Elizabeth Land
Pensacola Mountains